The Concurso Internacional de Tenis – Vigo (formerly Cidade de Vigo) is a tennis tournament held in Vigo, Spain. It is played on outdoor red clay courts. Between 2005 and 2009, the event was part of the ATP Challenger Tour. Since 2010, the tournament is part of the ITF Men's Circuit.

Past finals

Singles

Doubles

References

External links
ITF search

 
ATP Challenger Tour